Yin Yoga is  slow-paced style of yoga as exercise, incorporating principles of traditional Chinese medicine, with asanas (postures) that are held for longer periods of time than in other styles. Advanced practitioners may stay in one asana for five minutes or more. The sequences of postures are meant to stimulate the channels of the subtle body known as meridians in Chinese medicine and as nadis in Hatha yoga.

Yin Yoga poses apply moderate stress to the connective tissues of the body—the tendons, fasciae, and ligaments—with the aim of increasing circulation in the joints and improving flexibility. A more meditative approach to yoga, its goals are awareness of inner silence, and bringing to light a universal, interconnecting quality.

Yin Yoga was founded in the late 1970s by martial arts expert and Taoist yoga teacher Paulie Zink. Yin Yoga is taught across North America and Europe, encouraged by its teachers  Paul Grilley and Sarah Powers. As taught by Grilley and Powers, it is not intended as a complete practice in itself, but as a complement to more active forms of yoga and exercise. However, Zink's approach includes the full range of Taoist yoga, both yin and conventional.

Roots in India and China 

Long-held postures have been used both in India's Hatha yoga and in China's Tao yin (Taoist yoga). For example, B. K. S. Iyengar recommended holding Supta Virasana (reclining hero pose) for 10–15 minutes. Long-held stretches are similarly recommended in Western physical disciplines, such as gymnastics and ballet, to increase flexibility. 
Tao yin included poses like those of Yin Yoga in the system of Neidan (internal alchemy), intended to improve health and longevity. Taoist priests taught long-held poses, along with breathing techniques, to Kung Fu practitioners beginning 2000 years ago, to help them fully develop their martial arts skills.

History

Paulie Zink 

The practice of a series of long-held floor poses was introduced in North America in the late 1970s by the martial arts champion Paulie Zink.
In the late 1970s, Zink began to teach a synthesis of hatha yoga with Taoist yoga, as well as postures, movements and insights that he had developed himself. He later called this synthesis "Yin and Yang yoga," or "Yin Yoga" for short.

In his first years of teaching, many of Zink's students were martial arts practitioners who had developed strong but tight muscles, and he taught them only beginner level Taoist Yoga, focusing on long-held yin poses to alleviate their lack of flexibility. However, as more students came he began to teach more advanced levels. He explained that in order to develop full flexibility, the student must restore his own primal nature, through several Taoist yoga practices, as follows: yin asanas—mostly sitting or lying postures; yang asanas—more active, strenuous postures; Taoist Flow yoga—both yin and yang yoga postures practiced in continuous, smooth and circular motions; Chi Kung—involving simple and gentle movement and breathing techniques; and Taoist alchemy—based, supposedly, upon the Taoist theory of the five elements used in Chinese medicine. Taoist alchemy purports to embody the energetic attributes of various animals and to enliven the five alchemical elements believed to be contained in the body's energetic field, namely Earth, Metal, Water, Wood, and Fire. These are considered to animate distinct qualities in the body, namely calm, strength, fluidity, springiness and lightness, respectively.

Paul Grilley

The yoga teacher Paul Grilley sought Zink out and studied with him in the 1980s. Grilley studied anatomy in Montana under a doctor, Gary Parker, and then at the University of California, Los Angeles. There, he also taught conventional yoga including Ashtanga and Bikram Yoga, and managed a yoga studio. In 1989, Grilley met Hiroshi Motoyama, a Japanese scholar and yoga practitioner, who had researched the physiology of Traditional Chinese Medicine and written on it extensively. Motoyama was interested in the physiology of the meridians, or subtle pathways and vessels, and the qi or subtle energy hypothesized to flow through or get stored in them. These are fundamental concepts in Chinese medicine and acupuncture. He related these to the parallel concepts of the nadi pathways and chakras of Indian yoga, and the prana said to be carried within them. Grilley began to teach a fusion of the Yin poses he had learned from Zink with hatha yoga and anatomy, and the teachings of Motoyama. He created yin sequences with aims similar to that of an acupuncturist. Yin teacher and author Ulrica Norberg says that Grilley "evolved Yin Yoga further." Bernie Clark, a Yin Yoga author and teacher said that Grilley's synthesis of anatomy, Taoist Yoga, and meridian theory "resonated with many people who recognized the benefits of the practice and related to Paul's model of the body/mind/soul."

Sarah Powers

One of Grilley's students, the yoga teacher Sarah Powers, began teaching yoga in his style. She incorporated Buddhist psychology and put more emphasis on targeting the meridian systems for health and enlightenment. Her book, Insight Yoga, explains Yin Yoga sequences designed to enhance the flow of qi as understood in Traditional Chinese Medicine. She emphasized a conscious and systematic approach to breathing during yin practice. Grilley had at first called his approach Taoist Yoga, in deference to Zink's term. Powers, noting that the yoga she and Grilley were teaching was different from Zink's, suggested the term Yin Yoga. Zink adopted the term as a short form for "Yin and Yang Yoga." Powers began teaching Yin Yoga in her tours, referring students to Grilley for further information. Powers, Grilley, and Zink began offering Yin Yoga teacher training courses. By 2009, Yin Yoga had become available across North America and in Europe.

Principles

Yin and yang

Yin Yoga is based on the Taoist concepts of yin and yang, opposite and complementary principles in nature. Yin could be described as stable, immobile, feminine, passive, cold, and downward moving. Yang is understood to be changing, mobile, masculine, active, hot, and upward moving. The sun is considered yang, the moon yin. In the body, the relatively stiff connective tissues (tendons, ligaments, fascia) are considered yin, while the more mobile and pliable muscles and blood are called yang. More passive asanas in yoga are considered yin, whereas the more active, dynamic asanas are described as yang.

Yin Yoga employs specific sequences of poses to stimulate particular meridians, or subtle channels, as understood in Traditional Chinese Medicine; these are the equivalent of the nadi channels in hatha yoga.

In keeping with its roots in Taoist Yoga, Zink says that Yin Yoga has a deeper purpose: to "open the heart and invoke the primal self." Powers says one of the primary objectives of yin practice is the cultivation of inner stillness.

Distinction from conventional yoga

Although many Yin Yoga poses closely resemble the asanas of conventional or "yang" yoga, they have different names, in part to alert those familiar with conventional yoga not to perform them in the same way. In general, the poses of Yin Yoga are performed with little muscular exertion. For example, in Seal pose, in which a practitioner lies face down and raises the trunk, the upward movement is gradual and entirely supported by the arms, while the legs are relaxed, whereas in Bhujangasana (Cobra Pose), the practitioner actively curves the spine upward in an arc using arms and lower back muscles, and reaches back with the legs strongly. Because Yin Yoga does not make practitioners hot, the temperature of the room is kept a little higher than usual.

Practice

Zink's approach to Yin Yoga consists of both yin and yang postures, and incorporates movement in between postures as a yang element. In contrast, Yin Yoga sessions taught by Grilley and Powers consist of a series of long-held, passive floor poses that primarily affect the lower part of the body—the hips, pelvis, inner thighs, lower spine—about 18 to 24 in number. These areas are especially rich in connective tissues, the "loading" of which (Yin Yoga teachers avoid the word "stretching") is a main focus in this style of yoga.

During the long hold times of the yin asanas, teachers usually give "dharma talks", informal monologues that often explain the physiology and anatomy of poses, including the meridian lines being affected. They may tell traditional Buddhist stories, recite poetry, sing songs, or reflect on their own experience.

See also

 List of asanas#Asanas — Yin Yoga names are given in the table for the 'Yang' poses they most closely resemble in form
 Restorative Yoga — a different long-hold approach from Judith Lasater

References

Bibliography

External links
 Yin Yoga Teacher Training with Paul Grilley
 YinYoga.com with Bernie Clark
 TheYinYogaInstitute.com with Paulie Zink

Yoga styles